Amanita curtipes is a species of Amanita from southern Europe.

References

External links
 
 

curtipes